Richard Gyptner (3 April 1901 – 2 December 1972) was a German communist politician, activist and later a diplomat in East Germany.

Biography 
After graduating from a public school in Hamburg, he gained an apprenticeship in an electrical shop and then joined the Verband Deutscher Handlungsgehilfen ('Association of German Clerks').

In 1919, Gyptner was one of the founding members of the Communist Party of Germany (KPD) in Hamburg. In 1920 he became the first Chairman of the Communist Youth Association of Germany (KJVD). From 1922 to 1928 he was a member of the Executive Committee of the Young Communist International. In 1929 he became Georgi Dimitrov's secretary in the Comintern. In 1933 Gyptner went to Paris and worked in the office of the International Red Aid of Willi Münzenberg as representatives of the Comintern. In 1935 Gyptner went to the USSR, where he worked as an editor for the broadcaster Freies Deutschland in Moscow.

Gyptner returned to Germany on 30 April 1945 as a member of the Ulbricht Group, and in June 1945 he became secretary of the KPD Central Committee. After the Socialist Unity Party of Germany (SED) was founded in April 1946, Gyptner became one of the two secretaries of the SED party executive. Between March 1949 and May 1950 he was Vice President of the Berlin People's Police and held a leading position in the Political Information Department.

Gyptner headed the Kapitalistisches Ausland ('Capitalist Foreign') department in the Foreign Ministry.

Gyptner had been a member and later Honorary President of the  since 1954. From November 1955 to 1958 he was ambassador to China, from 1958 to 1961 plenipotentiary of the East German government for the Arab states in Cairo and from March 1961 to April 1963 ambassador to Poland. In 1964 he retired on a state pension in East Berlin. He died in 1972, and is buried at Zentralfriedhof Friedrichsfelde in Berlin.

Honors 

 1955 – Patriotic Order of Merit (Silver, 2nd class)
 1957 – 
 1960 – Banner of Labor
 1961 – Patriotic Order of Merit (Gold, 1st class)
 1965 – Order of Karl Marx

References

1901 births
1972 deaths
East German politicians
Communist Party of Germany politicians
Socialist Unity Party of Germany politicians
German emigrants to the Soviet Union
Executive Committee of the Communist International
German Comintern people
Independent Social Democratic Party politicians
Recipients of the Patriotic Order of Merit
Recipients of the Patriotic Order of Merit in gold
Recipients of the Patriotic Order of Merit in silver
Communists in the German Resistance